North Point is a mixed-use urban area in the Eastern District of Hong Kong. Located in the northeastern part of Hong Kong Island, the area is named after a cape between Causeway Bay and Tsat Tsz Mui that projects toward Kowloon Bay.

Location
North Point is bounded by Oil Street to the west and by Tin Chiu Street to the east, by Victoria Harbour to the north and Braemar Hill to the southeast. Causeway Bay neighbourhood lies west of North Point, while the Tsat Tsz Mui is east of North Point.

History

Parts of North Point have been inhabited since before the British arrived in the mid-19th century. The Metropole Hotel was built in 1899 and was used until 1906. In 1919, the Hongkong Electric Company started operation of the territory's second power station at North Point. In the 1920s, Ming Yuen Amusement Park became a popular entertainment venues on the Island. During the 1930s, the beaches of North Point became one of the most popular places for holding swimming gala in Hong Kong. In 1938, the North Point Refugee Camp was built to accommodate the influx of refugees from the Mainland. The camp comprised 26 huts. Access to the camp was via Kam Hong Road and Marble Road. During World War II, the camp was renamed the North Point Camp, and used as a prisoner of war camp for captured Canadian soldiers during the Japanese occupation.

During the Chinese Civil War, a large number of the rich and middle class from Shanghai fled to Hong Kong to escape the turmoil of war, many of them settled in North Point. In 1950, North Point became known as "Little Shanghai", since in the minds of many, it has already become the replacement for the surrendered Shanghai in China. The first wave of emigrants introduced Shanghai-style restaurants, beauty parlours and barbershops. They also learned Cantonese and intermarried with people of other dialect groups. During the 1950s, North Point was the premiere place of residence for these emigrants, leading to a massive population boom; by the end of 1960, North Point was listed as the most densely populated place on earth by the Guinness Book of Records. The first school in Hong Kong to use Mandarin as the main medium of instruction, Kiangsu and Chekiang Primary School, was founded in 1953 in North Point by these early Shanghainese immigrants. Shanghai at the time was heavily associated with leftist movements; leftist-supported businesses in North Point, such as the Sunbeam Theatre which showcases Chinese Opera, are a legacy of their influence.

The second group that moved to North Point were the Hokkien Fujianese, who were mostly displaced by political events in China but then soon mostly moved to countries in Southeast Asia, such as the Philippines and Indonesia. Small Indonesian specialist grocery shops selling coffee, coconuts, and bumbu are some of the remaining traces of their identity. The area became known as "Little Fujian". And Chun Yeung Street which is one iconic place that you can easily find variety of traditional Fujianese food from the grocery shops, such as "misua", "tokwa", "tikoy", "lumpia" & "green bean cake", which are all also part of Chinese Filipino cuisine in the Philippines.

Culture
After Cantonese, Hokkien Min Nan is the most widely spoken language in North Point. Many Min Nan associations are based in North Point to bring people from the same towns or villages together. Several Min Nan-speaking churches are located in North Point to serve the Min Nan Christians.

Today, North Point comprises a mix of new luxury developments and older Chinese buildings.

These are the cultures of North Point nowadays.

Economy
The head office of Sino United Publishing is in the S U P Tower in North Point.

Housing

City Garden, built from 1983 to 1986, is a private housing estate consisting of 14 blocks, each 28 storeys tall. Part of the site was occupied North Point Power Station before 1983.

North Point Estate, beside that, the North Point Ferry Pier, was demolished in 2003.

Education
There are three government primary schools in North Point. Located at 888 King's Road, the North Point Government Primary School (NPGPS) opened in 1954. The North Point Island Place Primary and Kindergarten School is located on Tanner Road and is in the Island Place Estate. The North Point Government Primary School (Cloud View Road) abbreviated as NPCVR, also opened in 1954, is located at 22 Cloud View Road. All three schools are whole-day, co-ed and have nominated secondary school status with Shau Kei Wan GSS, Shau Kei Wan East GSS and Clementi Secondary School.

The Chinese International School is located on Hau Yuen Path in Braemar Hill and is a private, co-educational school providing education to students from Reception to Year 13. Established in 1983, the school has a diverse student body with over 30 nationalities represented. Secondary school students pursue the IB Primary Years Programme before moving on to the IB Diploma.

North Point is in Primary One Admission (POA) School Net 14. Within the school net are multiple aided schools (operated independently but funded with government money) and North Point Government Primary School.

 Former schools
 Java Road Government Primary School
 The Hong Kong Japanese School's Secondary Section was formerly on Braemar Hill in North Point. In April 2018 the junior high school moved to the Happy Valley campus.

Transport

MTR
North Point is served by the Island line and the Tseung Kwan O line of the MTR rapid transit railway system. North Point station is the terminus of the Tseung Kwan O line.

Tramway
North Point is also served by Hong Kong Tramways, of which it is one of the seven terminal points.

Bus
Kowloon Motor Bus, New World First Bus and Citybus have routes through North Point.

Ferry
Hongkong and Yaumati Ferry services connect North Point Ferry Pier to various places in Hong Kong, including Hung Hom, Kowloon City, and Kwun Tong. During the annual Tin Hau Festival, special ferries operate from North Point Ferry Pier to Joss House Bay. North Point is also served by public light buses.

Thoroughfares
There is one highway, Island Eastern Corridor, serving North Point; it runs along the waterfront of the area.

Streets in North Point include:

 Boat Street
 Cheung Hong Street
 Ching Wah Street
 Chun Yeung Street
 City Garden Road
 Comfort Terrace
 Electric Road
 Fort Street
 Fortress Hill Road
 Hei Wo Street
 Java Road
 Kam Hong Street
 Kam Ping Street
 Kin Wah Street
 King's Road (partially)
 Marble Road
 Ming Yuen Western Street
 North Point Estate Lane
 North Point Road
 North View Street
 Oil Street
 Peacock Road
 Power Street
 Shu Kuk Street
 Tanner Road
 Tin Chiu Street
 Tin Chong Street
 Tin Hau Temple Road (partially)
 Tong Shui Road
 Tsat Tsz Mui Road
 Wharf Road
 Yuet Tuen Street

See also
 List of places in Hong Kong
 State Theatre (Hong Kong)
 Fujianese organized crime

References

External links

 History of North Point, in Heritage Impact Assessment on the Former Clubhouse of Royal Hong Kong Yacht Club at 12 Oil Street Vol 1 Part 1, pp. 9–70
 Sun Ferry
 Fortune Ferry

 
Eastern District, Hong Kong